Zachary German (born December 17, 1988) is an American novelist and poet. His first novel, Eat When You Feel Sad, was published by Melville House in 2010.

German's poems and prose have been published in Dennis Cooper's Userland anthology, 3:AM Magazine, Bear Parade, and Small Distribution Press.

Eat When You Feel Sad

Eat When You Feel Sad was published by Melville House in February 2010. It is about a character named Robert in an unnamed city.

Online and print response to Eat When You Feel Sad was mixed. It has been reviewed in Bookslut, The Rumpus, Time Out Chicago, Publishers Weekly, Philadelphia City Paper, and Nylon. Dennis Cooper said of the book, "Zachary German's nimble, catwalking, archeological, surface dwelling, emotionally unpaved prose is a thing of total wonder and my favorite drug, language-based or otherwise. Eat When You Feel Sad is so bright and pleasurable and full of excellence, it's positively serene." Tao Lin said of the book, "Moving, funny, emotional, and—in a revolutionary way—both highly readable and avant-garde, Eat When You Feel Sad excites me very much in terms of literature and also life itself."

Shitty Youth

In 2010, German started the internet radio show Shitty Youth after the death of his previous internet radio show Every Time A Police Officer Gets Shot I Throw a Party Radio. Shitty Youth generally broadcasts on Sundays.

In November 2012, director Adam Humphreys released a documentary about German, also titled Shitty Youth.

References

External links
 Eat When You Feel Sad at Melville House http://www.mhpbooks.com/book.php?id=312

1988 births
American male novelists
Living people
American male poets
21st-century American novelists
21st-century American poets
21st-century American male writers